Crookers is the musical project of Italian DJ and producer Francesco "Phra" Barbaglia.

Crookers was originally a duo consisting of Phra and fellow producer Bot, who worked together from 2003 to 2012. When the two artists met, both were trying to branch out of their genre and explore dance music. Their first collaboration worked. Phra said, "It felt natural to team up, seeing that we had the same musical tastes... which isn't that easy here in Milan."

On October 19, 2012, it was announced that Bot had left the group to pursue a new direction and that Phra would carry on the Crookers name as a solo project.

Since then, Phra has produced the song "Ghetto Guetta" under the Crookers alias; the song was published on Phra's own label Ciao Recs under licence to the Be Yourself Catalog as well as Owsla. 
Phra has released singles from his forthcoming  'Sixteen Chapel' album.  'Heavy' followed 'Ghetto Guetta' as the second single off the album. There were remixes from Hybrid Theory, Donovans and Sharkslayer & First Gift. Following that, Crookers then released Able To Maximize via Ciao Recs with remixes from Chuckie, franskild, Mao Ra Sun, Digi and Suck Fake. Phra then released 'Get Excited ft STS' for free via his social media. During this time, Phra asked the group Plastic Horse to put their spin on the music videos.

Crookers' track "Picture This" was released via Ciao Recs on 9 September and his new album Sixteen Chapel was scheduled to be released in February 2015..

Biography
Phra began DJing at age 11, when he was introduced to the Italian hip hop scene.

Crookers' first international release was on Berlin's Man Recordings (Funk Mundial #3), for which they contributed various remixes. The duo later released three EPs in 2008 (Knobbers, Mad Kidz and E.P.istola, all containing exclusive original tracks). In 2009, Crookers released the song, "Business Man", featuring British rapper Wiley and Thomas Jules. That was featured in the racing video game Need for Speed: Nitro, which was also released that year. Their debut album, Tons of Friends, was released in 2010.

Their collaboration with Kid Cudi in "Day 'N' Nite" entered the UK Singles Chart at number 2 and is featured on the game Midnight Club: Los Angeles.

Crookers work with producer/remixer Sketch Iz Dead on many of their tracks.

In 2009, Crookers proudeced the track "Business Man" with Wiley and Thomas Jules. Later that year, Crookers DJed on ElectroChoc, an in-game radio station of Grand Theft Auto: The Ballad of Gay Tony, which is based around the nightclub scene of Liberty City. Also, the group gained significant attention as the closing song in the final GTAIV game ("The Ballad of Gay Tony") is "No Security". In the same year they remixed 'Get On Your Boots' by U2 and confirmed to be one of the most acclaimed DJ duos of that period.

In November 2010, the duo signed a deal with Interscope Records, and they released their new single "We Love Animals" under the label as their first single of their upcoming second studio album.

On , Crookers released The Gonzo Anthem EP. Then on 24 October, they released their second album, Dr Gonzo, featuring Neoteric, Savage Skulls, Wax Motif, His Majesty Andre, Lazy Ants and Keith & Supabeatz.  The album has been described as a return to their original style.

Bot left the group in October 2012. Phra continues to use the Crookers name as a solo project.

Phra released a new track called ""Ghetto Guetta"" on the 22 October 2013 on Ciao Recs, and released it on 29 October 2013 on Big & Dirty Recordings under license to the Be Yourself Catalogue.

Discography

LP

EP and singles

Music videos

Remixes

References

External links
 

Musical groups established in 2003
Italian electronic music groups
Italian dance music groups
Italian musical duos
Club DJs
Remixers
Electronic dance music duos
Male musical duos
Dance-punk musical groups
Musicians from Milan
Musical groups from Milan
Mad Decent artists
Owsla artists
Interscope Records artists
Dim Mak Records artists